HSBC Bank Polska S.A. offers Consumer finance, Corporate banking and Treasury services in Poland. Its headquarters are in Piłsudski Square, Warsaw.

Polski Kredyt Bank S.A. joins the HSBC Group
On the 11 September 2003, the Polish Commission of Banking Supervision announced its approval for the acquisition of Polski Kredyt Bank S.A. from its parent, Kredyt Bank S.A. and the granting of a new banking licence to the bank. HSBC agreed a price of approximately PLN31 million (approximately US$7.8 million), and renamed Polski Kredyt Bank S.A. as HSBC Bank Polska S.A. following completion.

HSBC Holdings plc announces the appointment of [Sumanth Pasupuleti] as a  Chief Technology Officer (CTO) of HSBC Bank Polaska S.A and Head of Commercial & Global Banking Line  Designate from 1 June 2017.

Polish banking

Consumer finance
Using Household International’s established business model, HSBC offers unsecured loans, credit cards and affinity cards via relationships with retail partners, as well as through a network of Personal Banking branches, under the trading name of Beneficial Kredyt. Other activities include affinity loans to members of groups or companies, direct loans and the provision of payment protection insurance.

Corporate banking and treasury
HSBC in Poland provides banking services to local subsidiaries of multinational groups, major local corporates, both private and state owned, local financial institutions and HSBC Group clients. HSBC is a member of the local high and low value clearing systems, and is a market leader in the utilisation and application of advanced treasury products in zloty and in all major currencies.

See also

 HSBC Bank plc (direct parent company)
 HSBC Holdings plc (ultimate parent company)

External links
 HSBC Poland

Poland
Banks of Poland